Leonard Jennett Simpson (July 30, 1882 – August 18, 1940) was a physician and political figure in Ontario. He represented Simcoe Centre in the Legislative Assembly of Ontario from 1929 to 1940 as a Liberal member.

Background
The son of James Simpson and Rachael Jennett, he was born in Thornton, Ontario. Simpson was educated at the University of Toronto. In 1911, he married Eleanor M. Dutcher.

Politics
Simpson ran unsuccessfully for a seat in the Ontario assembly in 1923.

He served as Minister of Education from 1934 to 1940. In 1935, he was named honorary president of the Royal Astronomical Society of Canada. Simpson died in office in Picton, Ontario at the age of 58.

Cabinet positions

References 

1882 births
1940 deaths
Ontario Liberal Party MPPs
Members of the Executive Council of Ontario
University of Toronto alumni